Callinicus pictitarsis is a species of robber flies in the family Asilidae.

References

Further reading

External links

 Diptera.info

Asilidae
Insects described in 1878
Taxa named by Jacques-Marie-Frangile Bigot